Zionism, seeking territorial concentration of all Jews in the Land of Israel
 Jewish Territorialism, seeking territorial concentration in any land possible
 Jewish Autonomism, seeking an ethnic-cultural autonomy for the Jews of Eastern Europe
 Yiddishism, some proponents of which regarded Yiddish-speakers as a national group
 Bundism, which combined Yiddishist Autonomism with socialism
 Soviet Yiddishism, promoting Yiddish-speakers as a national group in the USSR with its own Jewish Autonomous Oblast 
 Golus nationalism, nationalism of the Jewish diaspora